Notes on Linguistics was "a quarterly publication of the International Linguistics Department of the Summer Institute of Linguistics."
It originated as a subscription journal, from 1975 through 2001, intended to share practical, theoretical, and even administrative information. More specifically, however, it was intended to provide linguistic field workers with "news, reviews, announcements, and articles" stimulating interest in linguistics and helping them stay current with progress in the discipline.

Notes and references

External links 

 Notes on Linguistics — official webpage @ Summer Institute of Linguistics website, with all back issues

Linguistics journals
Magazines established in 1975
Magazines disestablished in 2001
Quarterly magazines published in the United States
Magazines published in California
Defunct magazines published in the United States